University of Hama, founded in 2014  with 15 faculties, is a public university located in the city of Hama, Syria. It was established by Presidential Decree No. 19 for 2014 issued by Bashar Al-Assad.

Structure

Faculties  

Veterinary Medicine: Founded in 1969 (was part of Aleppo university then part of alBaath university in 1979 and then part of Hama university in 2014).
Dentistry: Founded in 1979.
Economics: Founded in 2005.
Physical Education: Founded in 2005.
Arts and Humanities: Founded in 2006.
Education: Founded in 2006.
Nursing: Founded in 2008. 
Agriculture: Founded in 2011.
Medicine: Founded in 2012.
Architecture: Founded in 2013.
Applied Science: Founded in 2013.
Pharmacy: Founded in 2014.
Science: Founded in 2014.
Civil Engineering: Founded in 2016.
Mechanical and Electrical Engineering: Founded in 2021.

Institutes 
 Higher Institute of Languages.
 Technical Institute of Dentistry.
 Technical Institute of Emergency Medical Services.
 Technical Institute of Computer.
 Technical Institute of Agricultural studies.
 Technical Institute of Veterinary Medicine.

University Hospital  
Currently there is one university hospital being built in campus (nowadays medical students are being trained in Hama National Hospital and Assad Women and Children's Hospital, which are directed by Ministry Of Health).

Presidents 

 Azzam Riyad al-Kurdi
 Mohamed Ziad Mamdouh Sultan
 Abdulrazzak Salem

Logo 
The emblem of Hama University represent the iconic ancient Norias of Hama city in brown color along with the decorated university name in green.

References 

Hama
Education in Syria
Buildings and structures in Hama
Educational institutions established in 2014
2014 establishments in Syria